, known in English as Ryoko's Case File, is a Japanese light novel written by Yoshiki Tanaka and illustrated by Narumi Kakinouchi. It was adapted into manga and an anime television series, two Drama CDs had also been released prior to the anime adaptation with different voice actors.

Plot
The series is centered on an elite police officer named Ryōko Yakushiji. A graduate of Tokyo University's Law Faculty, she is currently among the youngest superintendents in the Tokyo Metropolitan Police Department. With the assistance of her subordinate Junichirō Izumida, Ryōko works with her colleagues including her rival and fellow superintendent Yukiko Muromachi, alongside JACES security forces personnel and her personal maids Lucienne and Marianne, to investigate and resolve seemingly paranormal, supernatural or bizarre events that become involved in criminal cases—particularly when police procedures or modern science cannot be applied—before they go out of hand.

Because the light novels, manga and the anime adaptations have different stories, paranormal events and creatures involved, their central plots are most of the time different from each other.

Organizations

JACES
Owned by the Yakushiji family, it's a security company that ex-police officers both enlisted and high-ranking are employed into after their retirement. JACES is well known as one of Asia's best security companies, with its main headquarters located in Akasaka. The company's official slogan is "Safety". Its personnel use gray for their uniform color.

In combat operations, they use PASGT ballistic helmets, gray BDUs, tactical vests and light to medium body armor. JACES personnel are armed with expandable baton sticks when they encounter unarmed people.

Its origins are traced back to the end of World War II when the Japanese Empire Security Service was established before it became JACES, which was supposed to be used for the basis of a restructured Japanese military before Ruriko went to create the JPP instead.

Japan Private Police
They are known to be hired in war-torn countries after military forces are pulled back, conducting police duties in their place. JPP personnel are also hired as private security guards. JPP uses green as its color as evident in their uniforms. Unlike JACES, where most of its manpower comes from ex-law enforcement personnel, JPP recruits its personnel mostly from ex-SDF personnel.

During combat operations, JPP personnel are identified with green heavy body armor, anti-riot helmets and are armed with mostly Howa Type 89 assault rifles, Heckler & Koch MP5 and Minebea PM-9 submachine guns with expandable baton sticks. In normal operations, JPP personnel operate as private guards and sometimes, deploy robot droids to help them conduct searches and patrols with/for them.

Shiba
Located in the Greater Tokyo Area,  is said to house several departments of the Tokyo Metropolitan Police Department that operate under secret circumstances for covert missions.

It takes its name from the Shiba district of Tokyo's Minato ward.

Characters

Main

 (TV)
 (Drama CD)
A 27-year-old officer, holding the rank of Superintendent, in the Tokyo Metropolitan Police Department's Criminal Investigation Bureau, she graduated from Tokyo University's Law Faculty. She is quite skilled in armed and unarmed combat and tends to attack head-on, with or without backup. Attractive, haughty, and fashionable, she has never been seen wearing the same clothes twice. She can also speak in several languages, most notably French, which made her the primary candidate for an assignment in France.
She has a romantic interest in her subordinate, Assistant Inspector Junichiro Izumida, and often shows it through her actions such as taking him along with her wherever she goes, finding ways to spend time with him even during his day off and sometimes asking him to spend the night at her place. But he is generally too naive to notice it.
Her grandfather, Masamoto Yakushiji, was the founder of the Japanese Empire Security Service, which was the predecessor to JACES - now a multinational security company - currently headed by her father, Hiroki Yakushiji. As his successor, Ryōko does not hesitate to use its assets if necessary to help her in her work. She has an older sister named Kinuko Yakushiji.
Because police officers go to JACES after they retire, her colleagues in the police force do not dare oppose her in fear that they will have no job after they leave the police. To top it all, Ryoko knows the dirty secrets of high-ranking government officials and so they are afraid to cross her. Most of the police officers, high-ranking government officials and media practitioners fear not only her influence and power but her personality as well.
Her rival, and fellow Superintendent, Yukiko Muromachi calls her Oryo.
 
 (TV)
 (Drama CD)
A 33-year-old non-career officer, holding the rank of Assistant Inspector, in the Tokyo Metropolitan Police Department's Criminal Investigation Bureau. After graduating from what he considers an average university, he started out as a uniformed police officer. He was previously with the 1st division of the Criminal Investigation Bureau prior to his reassignment to Superintendent Ryōko Yakushiji. He is very submissive, perhaps as a result of always being around Ryoko, but can also be assertive and aggressive when the situation calls for it. Junichiro is often caring and kind to the people close to him, always watching over his superior Ryōko and her rival Yukiko. He is quite oblivious to Ryōko's infatuation and her efforts to get his attention. Like his superior, Izumida is also quite skilled in armed and unarmed combat. Though he is usually on the receiving end of Ryoko's oppressive personality, he remains loyal to her and tries his best to protect her.
He is also the narrator of the entire series.

 (TV)
 (Drama CD)
A 27-year-old officer, holding the rank of Superintendent, in the Tokyo Metropolitan Police Department's Security Bureau. Ryōko calls her "Oyuki". Equally attractive and intelligent, their rivalry goes all the way back to their days in college and they never miss an opportunity to verbally antagonize each other. An epitome of decorum, Ryōko usually leaves her in charge of diffusing tense situations as well as press interviews. Although she is the daughter of an influential former police officer, her sense of justice prevents her from using her family ties in carrying out her duties. Her subordinate is Akira Kishimoto.

 (TV)
 (Drama CD)
A 23-year-old career officer, holding the rank of Assistant Inspector under Muromachi, he is an anime and manga otaku who looks up to Ryōko.

Allies

A uniformed officer in the Tokyo Metropolitan Police Department, she is responsible for mostly handling clerical works under Ryōko. She is 21 years old.

A colleague of Ryōko and Izumida's and a uniformed officer alongside Satomi. He is 29 years old.

 (TV)
 (Drama CD)
An old man who is a detective under Ryoko with the rank of Inspector. He is 50 years old.

One of Ryōko's maids from France. A blonde-haired girl, she is an expert in hacking though she can handle firearms.

 Another of Ryōko's maids from France. A short black-haired girl, she is an expert in handling all kinds of small arms.

Yakushiji Family

An older sister of Ryoko's. Ryōko calls her Okinu. She's 29 years old.

Father of Ryoko and Kinuko. Nothing is known about him, except that he is the head of the JACES security company and an ex-MPD high-ranking officer. He is 60 years old.

The main founder of the Japanese Empire Security Service, known as JACES in modern times, and grandfather of Kinuko and Ryoko Yakushiji.

Antagonists

A woman who has influence within Shiba. She appears to know Ryoko on a personal basis. She is also the true head of the Japan Private Police. Ruriko is seemingly ageless, having been alive after through World War II and was a co-founder of the Japanese Empire Security Service with Ryoko's grandfather Masamoto Yakushiji before she diverged and created JPP originally with the intent of reestablishing a "true" Japanese military using a security company as a cover.

An aide to Ryoko in JACES, he is also a double agent working on behalf of JPP.

Others

A perfect and successful result of the third attempt to clone Ryōko Yakushiji, using her DNA, by employing Hangon and modern cloning procedures. Ruriko tried to use her in the scheme to take control of JACES away from the entire Yakushiji family by capitalizing on her feelings for Junichirō. Over time, she decides to switch over to Ryōko's side because of those feelings. Her name, which means "My friend" in French (mon ami), is given by Ryōko after Junichiro misunderstands Marianne and Lucienne's pronunciation. She is known to the JPP as R-9.
At the end of the anime series, she is found to be under Ryōko's custody and even has Marianne and Lucienne keep an eye on her while going to a school in France.

Rogues
The following are rogues monsters/creatures that have appeared in the anime:
Giant Snake
Making its appearance in the Babylon building in Ginza, its great size was achieved by having it ingest various growth hormones. It died when the building was destroyed in an explosion.
Wisps
It's not known how they first appeared, but they showed up in the digital copies of the journalists' pictures of Yakushiji and Izumida.
Unknown Alpha Human
Created in an illegal experiment by combining human cells with DNA of an unknown prehistoric human. The monster that killed several yakuza assassins before it died of rapid cell degeneration.
Centipede Robot
A counter-terrorist robot created by the JPP, it went berserk after its defense systems, that recognizes anyone with a dangerous object as an enemy, was altered in a traffic accident. Ryoko defeats it by shooting its main sensor. It was later used by the JPP in trying to eliminate Ryoko and Junichiro.
Mutant Mangrove Seeds
Said to have been created through secret experiments of JPP scientists, they were able to possess and control Ryojin Tadomura and a faction of the JPP before Marianne destroys the mutant mangrove tree with napalm grenades. They were later used again in the attempt to take Yakushiji down.
Unknown Cricket
Discovered by an unknown person, this species has the ability to resonate sound waves that are equal or greater than the sound waves on cellphones. The sound evokes terrible memories in the target, making them commit suicide.

Media

Light novel
The light novel series had first started in 1996 with 11 volumes in circulation. Kodansha has the publication rights on the series and published all bunko editions, but other publishers also published some volumes borrowing the rights by Kodansha.

Volume list
The following have been published as part of the light novels written by Dr. Yoshiki Tanaka:

Drama CD
Two drama CDs were put on the market by Avex in 1999 (Tokyo Nightmare) and 2001 (Matenrō). The cast was different from the later anime version.

Manga

The manga started in 2004 in Kodansha's seinen manga magazine Magazine Z. Its chapters were collected into eleven tankōbon volumes, released from July 23, 2004 to January 23, 2009. After Magazine Z ceased its publication, the series was transferred to Monthly Afternoon. The series began in the May 2009 issue of Monthly Afternoon, published on March 25, 2009, and it was renamed . The series finished in the January 2010 issue of Monthly Afternoon, released on November 25, 2009. It was compiled into two volumes, published on September 23, 2009 and January 22, 2010. A third series, titled , started in the March 2010 issue of Monthly Afternoon, published on January 25, 2010. The series finished in the November 2010 issue of the magazine, published on September 25, 2010. Two volumes released on June 23, 2010 and November 22, 2010. A fourth series, titled  was serialized from the October 2012 issue, published on August 25, 2012, and the January 2013 issue, published on November 24, 2012. A compiled volume was released on January 23, 2013. A fifth series, titled  was serialized in Monthly Afternoon from the February 2013 issue, published on December 25, 2012, to the November 2013 issue, published on September 25, 2013. Two volumes were published on May 23 and November 22, 2013.

A spin-off manga was also created by Yoshiki Tanaka and Narumi Kakinouchi, titled , compiled in three volumes, released from June 17, 2008 to November 22, 2011.

In Taiwan, it has been published by Sharp Point Press.

Volume list

Artbook
An artbook released with drawings related to the manga series called  was released by Kodansha on August 28, 2006.

Anime

A 13-episode anime television series adaptation was broadcast from July 5 to September 27, 2008, with animation done by Doga Kobo. It aired on BS11 Digital, Chiba TV, KBS Kyoto, Sun TV, Tokyo MX, TV Aichi, Television Saitama and TVK television stations. The opening theme is Thème principal by KATSU (angela). The ending themes are various through series: À demain sur la lune (#1,3), Ryoko 2 (#2,6), Songe d'une nuit d'été (#4,7,9,10,12), La Vie en rose (#5), Le combat (#8,11) by KATSU (angela), and Thème principal La chanson d'atsuko (#13) by atsuko (voice) and KATSU (music). The series was released on 3 DVDs from September 26, 2008 to January 21, 2009. It was also available via broadband access streaming.

The series began streaming in North America on RetroCrush as an exclusive title on November 5, 2021 under the name Ryoko's Case File.

Soundtracks
A BGM OST, Volume 1 with music from the show was released on June 4, 2008 with 8 tracks. The second volume had been released on August 6, 2008 with 17 tracks with a third OST on September 10, 2008 with 13 tracks. All three OSTs have the title Le recueil des faits improbables de Ryōko Yakushiji, which is the show's title in French, and the most of composition are also named in French.

Reception

Dengeki Online places Yakushiji Ryōko no Kaiki Jikenbo on 7th place out of 10 news weekly events for June 1, 2008.

References

Notes

Citations

External links
 Starchild's Official Site 
 Tokyo MX's Official Site 
 

1996 Japanese novels
2004 manga
Doga Kobo
Japanese serial novels
Kodansha books
Kodansha manga
Light novels
Novels by Yoshiki Tanaka
Seinen manga
Sharp Point Press titles